Passover is the debut album from psychedelic rock band The Black Angels, released in 2006.

Track listing 

"Young Men Dead" – 5:32
"The First Vietnamese War" – 3:30
"The Sniper at the Gates of Heaven" – 4:16
"The Prodigal Sun" – 4:23
"Black Grease" – 4:37
"Manipulation" – 5:49
"Empire" – 5:35
"Better Off Alone" – 3:03
"Bloodhounds on My Trail" – 3:58
"Call to Arms" – 18:06
 The song "Call to Arms" ends at minute 10:42. After 3 minutes and 30 seconds of silence (10:42 - 14:12), begins a hidden song: it's a cover of Jimmy Cliff's "Vietnam" with modernized lyrics referring to the Iraq War.

Credits

 Nate Ryan - bass, guitar
 Stephanie Bailey - drums, percussion
 Christian Bland - guitar, bass, vocals
 Alex Maas - vocals, bass
 Jennifer Raines - drone machine
 Recorded and mixed by Erik Wofford at Cacophony Recording Studio (except tracks 5 & 6 by Ross Ingram at Wire Recording & Shh! Recording)
 Mastered by Dave Cooley at Bionic
 Graphic Design by Christian Bland & Brian Jones
 Printed by Thingmakers

In popular culture
 "Black Grease" was featured in the video game Grand Theft Auto V, and in episode "Church in Ruins" from second season of True Detective (2015).
 "Young Men Dead" was used in the first episode of the first season of True Detective.
 "Young Men Dead" and "The Prodigal Sun" were featured in the 2007 film Death Sentence (2007 film) 
 "The Prodigal Sun" was featured in the spanish film Perdedores Natos, directed by Chris Jiménez in 2013.
 "Young Men Dead" was also featured in the second episode of the first season of Fringe 2008, the episode "Prophets" of the fourth season of the TV series Person of Interest, the Season 5 episode "Frontforwards" of the United States series Covert Affairs., the episode "The Long Bright Dark" of True Detective (2014), the Comic Con 2014 highlight reel for Person of Interest, the 2010 video game Alan Wake and the 2011 Snowboarding Documentary The Art of Flight
 A remixed version of "Young Men Dead" plays in the teaser trailer for Jack Reacher.
 "The First Vietnamese War" was featured in the 2012 video game Spec Ops: The Line.
 "Young Men Dead" was featured in the Fable III launch trailer.
 "Young Men Dead" was featured in the 2020 video game The Last of Us Part II.
 "Manipulation" was featured in the episode "Mistrut Blossons" of the 2018 TV series Condor.

References

Need for Speed The Run - Better off Alone

The Black Angels (band) albums
2006 albums
Light in the Attic Records albums